King George Bay is a large bay on the coast of West Falkland in the Falkland Islands, facing westwards. There are three settlements on the bay Chartres, Dunnose Head and Roy Cove. Storm Mountain is on the north coast. It contains numerous islands, including the Passage Islands and Split Island.

See also
Stump Rock

References

Bays of West Falkland